Agrotis hephaestaea is a moth of the family Noctuidae. It was first described by Edward Meyrick in 1899. It is endemic to the Hawaiian islands of Kauai, Oahu and Molokai.

The larvae feed on Wikstroemia species. The caterpillars are found on their food plant during the daytime.

Full-grown larvae are about 40 mm in length. They are nearly uniformly dark fuscous, minutely spotted with paler, whitish spots on the ventral surface. The head is light ferruginous and the cervical shield is black with a broad yellow discal patch which is widest posteriorly. There is a median white line which extends indistinctly onto the two following segments. The setae are very short, pale and each in a black dot. The anal shield is black with several yellow spots. The spiracles are oval and entirely black.

The pupa is 20 mm long and yellowish brown, infuscated on the dorsum of the metathorax and the abdomen. A dorsal transverse band of small pits is found near the anterior margin of 5th, 6th and 7th abdominal segments. The wing-sheaths, antennae-sheaths and posterior leg-sheaths extend to the apex of the 4th abdominal segment. The cremaster has two short diverging spines, which are thick at the base and dark reddish, apical half whitish. Pupation takes place in the soil.

External links

Agrotis
Endemic moths of Hawaii
Moths described in 1899